Welcome to the Blackout (Live London '78) is a live album by English singer-songwriter David Bowie recorded on the Isolar II Tour. It had a limited vinyl release on 21 April 2018 for Record Store Day. A more widely available CD edition followed on 29 June 2018, along with digital releases for download and streaming.

Recording
The album was recorded live during the Isolar II Tour at Earls Court, London on 30 June and 1 July 1978 by Tony Visconti with the RCA mobile unit. It was mixed by Bowie and David Richards at Mountain Studios, Montreux, from 17–22 January 1979.

The 1st July performances of "Be My Wife" and "Sound and Vision" were previously released on the semi-official 1995 Mainman compilation album, Rarestonebowie.

The shows were filmed by the director David Hemmings for cinematic release later in 1978. Bowie was dissatisfied with the film and it was never released, saying in 2000, “I simply didn’t like the way it had been shot."

Track listing

Vinyl release

CD Release

Personnel
David Bowie – vocals, chamberlin
Adrian Belew – lead guitar, backing vocals
Carlos Alomar – rhythm guitar, backing vocals, music director
George Murray – bass guitar, backing vocals
Dennis Davis – drums, percussion
Roger Powell – keyboards, Moog Taurus bass pedals, synthesizer, backing vocals
Sean Mayes – piano, ARP String Ensemble, backing vocals
Simon House – electric violin
 Producer: Tony Visconti
 Post production mix: David Bowie, David Richards
 Photography: Sukita and Chris Walter

Live performance personnel
Jan Michael Alejandro – band tech
Vern "Moose" Constan – band tech
Leroy Kerr – band tech
Buford Jones – FOH mixer
Townsend Wessinger – Showco sound crew
Billy King – Showco sound crew
Russell Davis – Showco sound crew
Randy Marshall – Showco sound crew
Glenn George – Showco sound crew

Charts

References

David Bowie live albums
Albums produced by Tony Visconti
Parlophone live albums
RCA Records albums